Alan J. Ryan, also known as Ginger Ryan (born 26 September 1909, died at an unknown date), was an Australian rules footballer who played with Melbourne and Collingwood in the Victorian Football League (VFL).

In a match for Collingwood against Fitzroy Football Club in 1935, Ryan had to kick for goal from 35 metres out after the final siren with Collingwood trailing by six points (a goal would draw the match). Hundreds of spectators ran onto the ground while Ryan was lining up for goal and just as he was about to kick, a police trooper on horseback rode in front of Ryan, startling him. The horse reared but Ryan was still able to clear the trooper to kick the goal.

In 1939 Ryan was cleared to play for Brunswick in the Victorian Football Association.

References

Sources
 Atkinson, G. (1982). Everything you ever wanted to know about Australian rules football but couldn't be bothered asking. The Five Mile Press: Melbourne. .

External links

1909 births
Year of death missing
Melbourne Football Club players
Collingwood Football Club players
Preston Football Club (VFA) players
Australian rules footballers from Victoria (Australia)
Brunswick Football Club players